Rajiv Nagar railway station is a small railway station in Patna district, Bihar. Its code is RVN. It serves Patna city. The station consists of one platform.

References

External links 

 Official website of the Patna district

Railway stations in Patna
Railway stations in Patna district
Danapur railway division